SFIAplus is the IT training and development model of the British Computer Society (BCS). 
Based on the original Industry Structure Model, first published by the BCS in July 1986, which was remapped to the Skills Framework for the Information Age (SFIA) and rebranded as SFIAPlus.

Background

Responding to the wide recognition of the importance of an externally accredited professional development scheme, the BCS consulted with hundreds of contributors developing SFIAPlus to enable individuals and organisations to:
 Understand the broad range of ICT practitioner roles and activities
 Research the experience, training and development required in those roles
 Benchmark IT skills against the framework
 Describe IT skills in a common language and a logical structure

SFIAPlus is used by a large number of organisations, including many major companies, to apply quality control to the practical experience and training of ICT practitioners, and is widely used outside the UK, forming the basis of the European Informatics Skills Structure used throughout Europe.

SFIAPlus tools

While the first version in 1986 (of the Industry Structure Model) was produced as a paper publication, the complexity in SFIAPlus mean that it is best accessed using a software interface (BCS describe it as three-dimensional as compared to the SFIA two-dimensional model).

SFIAPlus can be browsed to access the full range of ICT competencies and tasks, and there are a number of additional tools:

 BCS Career Builder 
 Individual tool for self-planning for career and professional development

 IT Job Describer
 Corporate tool for generating job descriptions using the SFIAPlus model

 Skills Manager
 Corporate tool for managing skills within an organisation against the SFIAPlus model

 Career Developer
 Corporate tool for planning the development of IT competencies against the SFIAPlus model

Structure

While SFIA maps IT competencies in two dimensions (skill categories and seniority) and briefly describes the 263 tasks expected of a role in each of the 78 categories at the relevant level of seniority; SFIAPlus extends this with additional categories, making 86 specific skills and 290 tasks; adding a more thorough overview of each competency (with eight skill resources); and providing significant detail behind each task description (six task components).

Task descriptions in SFIAPlus are supplemented by: 
 Background
 Work activities
 Knowledge and skills
 Training activities
 Professional development activities
 Qualifications

References

External links
 SFIAPlus, on the BCS website

British Computer Society
Information technology management